The fourth season of the Dragon Ball Z anime series contains the Garlic Jr., Future Trunks, and the Androids arcs, which comprises Part 1 of the Cell Saga. The episodes are produced by Toei Animation, and are based on the final 26 volumes of the Dragon Ball manga series by Akira Toriyama. 

The 32-episode season originally ran from September 1991 to May 1992 in Japan on Fuji Television. The first English airing of the series was on Cartoon Network where Funimation Entertainment dub of the series ran from November 1999 to October 2000.

Funimation released the season in a box set on February 19, 2008 and in June 2009, announced that they would be re-releasing Dragon Ball Z in a new seven volume set called the "Dragon Boxes". Based on the original series masters with frame-by-frame restoration, the first set was released November 10, 2009.


Episode list

References

1991 Japanese television seasons
1992 Japanese television seasons
Z (season 4)